The New Technology Institute, Birmingham (abbreviated to NTI Birmingham) is a training centre and media studio located in the Learning and Leisure Zone of the Eastside of Birmingham, England.

Part of by Birmingham City University, the building opened in January 2006 after one year of construction by what was then University of Central England. The building cost £10 million and the topping out ceremony was held on July 20, 2005.

The five-story building houses a purpose built training venue for business and management training skills on the ground floor, for IT training using Apple Mac computers, seminars, meetings, video conferences, product launches and networking events. Since autumn 2014, the building has been renamed University House, with the University's management and support services located on the remaining floors.

Training 
NTI Birmingham run a number of short, one- to five-day, software training courses accredited by Apple and Adobe.

In 2010, NTI Birmingham ran the first in a series of training events called Gamer Camp. The first of these, Gamer Camp: Nano, provided mentoring and tuition from Blitz Games Studios, Rare and Codemasters trained two groups of games artists and programmers over the course of a month to build two games for the iPhone.

Web design and development 
In January 2010, NTI Birmingham integrated the University's commercial-facing web, video and enterprise centre, Screen Media Lab, into its facilities. In February 2010, this led to the launch of the new core Birmingham City University website, following an extensive rebuild by Screen Media Lab/NTI Birmingham.

Enterprise programmes 
The organisation also has extensive experience in delivering programmes for businesses in the creative industries, and working on a range of projects for the private and public sector. These include Animation Forum West Midlands, BSeen, Insight Out, ECCE (Economic Clusters of Cultural Enterprise) and Young, Gifted & Talented (part of the national Gifted & Talented programme).

References

External links 
Official NTI Birmingham website
Gamer Camp
Birmingham City University
Animation Forum West Midlands
BSeen
Department for Education, Gifted & Talented scheme

Birmingham City University